Robert Girard (April 12, 1948 – November 5, 2017) was a Canadian ice hockey player who played 305 National Hockey League (NHL) games with the California Golden Seals, Cleveland Barons and Washington Capitals.  He scored 45 goals and 69 assists in his NHL career.  He also played for the Charlotte Checkers, Salt Lake Golden Eagles and Hershey Bears in the minor leagues.

He died in L'Épiphanie, Quebec on November 5, 2017 at age 69.

Career statistics

Regular season and playoffs

References

External links

1948 births
2017 deaths
French Quebecers
California Golden Seals players
Canadian expatriate ice hockey players in the United States
Canadian ice hockey forwards
Charlotte Checkers (SHL) players
Cleveland Barons (NHL) players
HC Lugano players
Hershey Bears players
Ice hockey people from Montreal
Salt Lake Golden Eagles (CHL) players
Salt Lake Golden Eagles (WHL) players
Undrafted National Hockey League players
Washington Capitals players